José María Bruguez was a Paraguayan general during the Paraguayan War. He was one of the most prominent Paraguayan generals of the war, being known for his artillery services during naval engagements of the war. He died during the 1868 San Fernando massacre after President Francisco Solano López accused Bruguez of conspiring against him.

Early Military Career
Bruguez was born on 1827 at Asunción. He enlisted in the Paraguayan Army in 1845 and was assigned within the artillery regiments. He was promoted to Lieutenant from 1852 to 1854 as he was in professional military classes taught by João Carlos de Villagran Cabrita and was reported to be his best student. He was in charge of the railway systems within Paraguay and promoted to Major along with being assigned to the chief of the Central Station on 1862.

Paraguayan War 
Upon the outbreak of the Paraguayan War, Bruguez participated in the Capture of the steamer Marquês de Olinda, directly ramming his artillery batteries against the ship which caused it to capsize. He then participated in the Battle of Riachuelo and would harass the Imperial Brazilian Navy with his artillery, managing to kill 12 men. He was awarded the Commander of the National Order of Merit on June 17, 1865 for his services in the battle. He continued his service during the Corrientes campaign during the Battle of Paso de Mercedes where he attempted to block the Imperial Brazilian Navy from passing the Paraná River. After losing the battle, he attempted to prevent the Allied forces from cutting off Paraguayan supplies at the Battle of Paso de Cuevas.

Already a Colonel by 1866, he would participate in the battles of Estero Bellaco and Tuyutí, being promoted to General on May 25. It was also reported that during the Battle of Purutué Bank, Bruguez killed his former teacher Villagran Cabrita with a grenade that was fired at him. After fighting in the battles of Boquerón and the Second Battle of Tuyutí, Bruguez was executed on August 26, 1868 during the 1868 San Fernando Massacre by President Francisco Solano López along with several other officers who Solano López thought were planning to overthrow him.

Legacy
The district of General José María Bruguez is named after him.

References

Bibliography

1827 births
1868 deaths
People from Asunción
Paraguayan generals
Paraguayan military personnel of the Paraguayan War
Paraguayan military personnel killed in action